Hark! The Village Wait is the debut album by the British folk rock band Steeleye Span, first released in 1970. It is the only album to feature the original lineup of the band as they broke up and reformed with an altered membership immediately after its release, without ever having performed live. Therefore, it is one of only two Steeleye Span studio albums to feature two female vocalists (Maddy Prior and Gay Woods), the other being Time (1996). A similar sound was apparent years later when Prior teamed up with June Tabor to form Silly Sisters. Overall, the album's sound is essentially folk music with rock drumming and bass guitar added to some of the songs. The banjo features prominently on several tracks, including "Blackleg Miner", "Lowlands of Holland" and "One Night as I Lay on My Bed".

The album's title refers not to the act of waiting, but to a wait, a small body of wind instrumentalists employed by a town at public charge from Tudor times until the early 19th century. A village, however, would likely be too small to employ such a troupe, so the wait referred to here was most probably the later Christmas Waits, as mentioned in the novels of Thomas Hardy.

Over the years, the band has returned to the material on this album several times. On their second album, Please to See the King, they offered a new version of "The Blacksmith". A new live version of "Blackleg Miner" appeared on Back in Line, and they offered a third variation on Present--The Very Best of Steeleye Span. On Time they reprised "Twa Corbies". "Copshawholme Fair" had two years earlier been recorded by Prior and Tim Hart on their album Folk Songs of Olde England Vol. 2. Copshaw Holm, otherwise known as Newcastleton, has been the site of a folk festival since 1970. Maddy Prior has lived nearby, just over the border in Cumbria, at 'Stones Barn' for several years.

Among the other songs on the album are the a cappella "A Calling-On Song" (the first of many a cappella pieces the band recorded), "The Hills of Greenmore" and "Dark-Eyed Sailor". The version of "Lowlands of Holland" here uses variant lyrics from the most common version of the song.

The album was originally issued in the UK on RCA, with the cover shown (above right). It was not issued in the US at that time. The cover for the reissue was changed to a sepia-toned image of 'The Leather Bottle', a pub in Cobham; it was issued on UK Chrysalis (and made its debut in the US on US Chrysalis) in 1975.

Track listing

All songs traditional, except where noted.

Personnel
Steeleye Span
Maddy Prior - vocals, 5-string banjo
Tim Hart - vocals, electric guitar, electric dulcimer, fiddle, 5-string banjo, harmonium
Ashley Hutchings - bass guitar
Terry Woods - vocals, electric guitar, concertina, mandola, 5-string banjo, mandolin
Gay Woods - vocals, concertina, autoharp, bodhran

Guest musicians
Gerry Conway - drums (tracks 2-3, 5-8)
Dave Mattacks - drums (tracks 4, 10-12)

References

1970 debut albums
Chrysalis Records albums
Steeleye Span albums
RCA Records albums
Mooncrest Records albums
United Artists Records albums
Albums produced by Maddy Prior
Albums produced by Gay Woods
Albums produced by Terry Woods
Albums produced by Tim Hart
Albums produced by Ashley Hutchings